Roger Heman Sr. (February 27, 1898 – March 14, 1969) was an American sound engineer. He won an Academy Award for Best Special Effects and was nominated for four more in the same category. He worked on more than 350 films during his career. His son was also a sound engineer.

Selected filmography
Heman won an Academy Award for Best Special Effects and was nominated for four more:

Won
 Crash Dive (1943)

Nominated
 The Black Swan (1942)
 Wilson (1944)
 Captain Eddie (1945)
 Deep Waters (1948)

References

External links

1898 births
1969 deaths
American audio engineers
Best Visual Effects Academy Award winners
People from Kentucky
20th-century American engineers